Malva moschata, the musk mallow or musk-mallow, is a species of flowering plant in the family Malvaceae, native to Europe and southwestern Asia, from Spain north to the British Isles and Poland, and east to southern Russia and Turkey.

Description 
The leaves are alternate, 2–8 cm long and 2–8 cm broad, palmately lobed with five to seven lobes; basal leaves on the lower stem are very shallowly lobed, those higher on the stems are deeply divided, with narrow, acuminate lobes. The flowers are produced in clusters in the leaf axils, each flower 3.2–5 cm in diameter, with five bright pink petals with a truncated to notched apex; they have a distinctive musky odour. The fruit is a disc-shaped schizocarp 3–6 mm in diameter, containing 10–16 seeds, the seeds individually enclosed in a mericarp covered in whitish hairs. It has a chromosome count of 2n=42.

Ecology 
Natural hybrids with the closely related Malva alcea are occasionally found.

The flowers are usually pollinated by bees.

Cultivation and uses 

Malva moschata is widely grown as an ornamental plant for its attractive scented flowers, produced for a long period through the summer. Several cultivars have been selected for variation in flower colour, including 'Rosea' with dark pink flowers. 

Leaves and flowers of muskmallow are common additions to "wild" salads. The seeds are also edible.

It has been introduced to and become naturalised in several areas with temperate climates away from its native range, including Scandinavia, New Zealand, and North America.

References

External links 
 
 
 
 Medical Uses, applications

moschata
Flora of Europe
Plants described in 1753
Taxa named by Carl Linnaeus